Margot Singer is an American short story writer and novelist. Her book The Pale of Settlement won the Flannery O'Connor Award for Short Fiction in 2006 and her novel Underground Fugue was listed as "one of the most anticipated books by women in 2017" by Elle Magazine.

Life
She graduated from Harvard University for her undergraduate degree, Oxford University with a M.Phil. in 1986 after she was awarded a Marshall Scholarship, and University of Utah with a Ph.D. in 2005.

Singer worked for the management consulting firm McKinsey & Company from 1986 until 1997, where she was a Principal in the New York Office. 
She teaches at Denison University in Granville, Ohio and at Queens University of Charlotte. She lives with her husband and two children in Granville, Ohio.

Her work has appeared Agni, Prairie Schooner, The Gettysburg Review, Shenandoah, The Western Humanities Review, The North American Review, The Sun, among other magazines.

Awards
 2006 Flannery O'Connor Award for Short Fiction for The Pale of Settlement
 Glasgow Prize for Emerging Writers for The Pale of Settlement
 Reform Judaism Prize for Jewish Fiction for The Pale of Settlement
 National Endowment for the Arts Fellowship 
 Carter Prize for the Essay
 2013 James Jones Literary Society First Novel Fellowship for The Art of Fugue, later retitled Underground Fugue.

Works
 
 Underground Fugue, Meville House,

References

External links
"Author's website"
"Interviewed by Anne Barngrover", Southeast Review, September 16, 2009

American short story writers
Harvard University alumni
Alumni of the University of Oxford
University of Utah alumni
Denison University faculty
Queens University of Charlotte faculty
Living people
People from Granville, Ohio
Year of birth missing (living people)